The reconstruction of Germany was a long process of rebuilding Germany after the destruction endured during World War II. Germany had suffered heavy losses during the war, both in lives and industrial power. 6.9 to 7.5 million Germans had been killed, roughly 8.26 to 8.86% of the population (see also World War II casualties). The country's cities were severely damaged from heavy bombing in the closing chapters of the war and agricultural production was only 35% of what it was before the war.

At the Potsdam Conference, the victorious Allies ceded roughly 25% of Germany's pre-Anschluss territory to Poland and the Soviet Union. The German population in this area was expelled, together with the Germans of the Sudetenland and the German populations scattered throughout the rest of Eastern Europe. Between 1.5 and 2 million are said to have died in the process, depending on source. As a result, the population density grew in the "new" Germany that remained after the dismemberment.

As agreed at Potsdam, an attempt was made to convert Germany into a pastoral and agricultural nation, allowing only light industry.  Many factories were dismantled as reparations or were simply destroyed (see also the Morgenthau Plan). Millions of German prisoners of war were for several years used as forced labor, by both the Western Allies and the Soviet Union. 

Beginning immediately after the German surrender and continuing for the next two years, the United States pursued a vigorous program to harvest all technological and scientific know-how, as well as all patents in Germany. John Gimbel comes to the conclusion in his book, Science Technology and Reparations: Exploitation and Plunder in Post-war Germany, that the "intellectual reparations" taken by the U.S. and the UK amounted to close to 10 billion dollars, equivalent to around 100 billion dollars in 2006. (see also Operation Paperclip).

As soon as 1945, the Allied forces worked heavily on removing Nazi influence from Germany in a process dubbed as "denazification".

By mid-1947, the success of denazification and the start of the Cold War had led to a re-consideration of policy, as the Germans were seen as possible allies in the contest, and it was becoming clear that the economic recovery of Europe was dependent on the reactivation of German industry. With the repudiation of the U.S. occupation directive JCS 1067 in July 1947, the Western Allies were able to start planning for the introduction of a currency reform to halt the rampant inflation. This type of action to help the German economy had been prohibited by the directive.

In 1947, the Marshall Plan, initially known as the  "European Recovery Program" was initiated. In the years 1947–1952,  some $13 billion of economic and technical assistance—-equivalent to around $140 billion in 2017—were allocated to Western Europe. Despite protests from many beneficiaries, the Marshall Plan, although in the less generous form of loans, was in 1949 extended to also include the newly formed West Germany. In the years 1949–1952, West Germany received loans which totaled $1.45 billion, equivalent to around $14.5 billion in 2006.

The country subsequently began a slow but continuous improvement of its standard of living, with the export of local products, a reduction in unemployment, increased food production, and a reduced black market.

In 1948, the Deutsche Mark replaced the occupation currency as the currency of the Western occupation zones, leading to their eventual economic recovery.

By 1950, the UK and France were finally induced to follow the U.S. lead, and stop the dismantling of German heavy industry. The country's economic recovery under the newly formed democratic government was, once it was permitted, swift and effective. During the mid-1950s, the unemployment rate in Germany was so low that it led to the influx of Turkish immigrants into the country's labor force. Germany's economy continued to improve until the 1973 oil crisis.

Rehabilitation milestones
In 1946, the US Secretary of State (foreign minister) makes the speech Restatement of Policy on Germany, repudiating the Morgenthau Plan policies.
In 1947, the JCS 1067 is rescinded.
In 1948, the Deutsche Mark replaces the almost worthless Reichsmark in the Allied western occupation zones, initiating the start of economic recovery in western Germany.
In 1949, West Germany is formed from the Western occupation zones, with the exception of the Saarland.
In 1949, the Marshall Plan is extended to include West Germany.
In 1950, the dismantling of West German heavy industry ends.
In 1955, the military occupation of West Germany ends.
In 1955, NATO, which was formed in 1949, allows West Germany to join.
In 1957, France returns the Saarland to West Germany.
In 1957, West Germany is one of the founding nations of the European Economic Community.
In 1973, West Germany joins the United Nations (formed in 1945).
In 1991, a unified Germany is allowed by the Allies of World War II to become fully sovereign after signing the Treaty on the Final Settlement with Respect to Germany.

See also
 GARIOA
 Allied plans for German industry after World War II
 Restatement of Policy on Germany
 Post-war reconstruction of Frankfurt
 The President's Economic Mission to Germany and Austria
 Vergangenheitsbewältigung
 Wirtschaftswunder

References

External links
 Clip from YouTube showing denazification activities

Contemporary German history